Thomas of Harqel was a miaphysite bishop from the early 7th century. Educated in Greek at the monastery of Qenneshre, he became bishop of Mabbug in Syria. He was deposed as bishop by the anti-miaphysite metropolitan Domitian of Melitene before 602. He and Paul of Tella lived as exiles in the Coptic monastery of the Enaton near Alexandria, Egypt. At the request of Athanasios I, they worked on a Syriac translation of the Greek Bible. Translation of the New Testament, known as the Harclensis was completed in 616. At this time, 2 Peter, 2 John, 3 John, Jude and Revelation were added to the Syriac Bible. Until then they were excluded.

References 

7th-century Syriac Orthodox Church bishops
7th-century deaths
Year of birth missing
Greek–Syriac translators
7th-century Byzantine writers
People of Roman Syria
7th-century Byzantine bishops